Storm in a Water Glass (German: Sturm im Wasserglas) is a 1960 West German comedy film directed by Josef von Báky and starring Ingrid Andree, Hanns Lothar and Therese Giehse. It is an adaptation of a play by Bruno Frank, which had previously been made into a 1931 film of the same title,  and, in 1937, in Great Britain, as, Storm in a Teacup.

It was shot at the Spandau Studios in Berlin. The film's sets were designed by the art director Erich Kettelhut and Johannes Ott.

Cast
Ingrid Andree as Viktoria Thoss 
Hanns Lothar as Hans Burdach 
Therese Giehse as Frau Vogel 
Peter Lühr as Dr. Thoss 
Erni Mangold as Lisa 
Harry Meyen as George 
Reinhold Pasch as Möller 
Willy Rösner as Dr. Wirz 
Michl Lang as Pfaffenzeller 
Werner Finck as veterinarian 
Werner Oehlschlaeger as Max Küppers 
Klaus Havenstein as Dressel 
Franz Fröhlich as Hosinger

References

External links

1960 comedy films
German comedy films
West German films
Films directed by Josef von Báky
Films shot at Spandau Studios
1960s German-language films
1960s German films